The First Presbyterian Church is a historic church in Mankato, Minnesota. It is a Richardsonian Romanesque-style building designed by Warren H. Hayes.  It was listed on the National Register of Historic Places in 1980.

The congregation was founded in 1855, three years after the town of Mankato was first platted.  The first church building was a log schoolhouse, and the second building was built in 1865.  Construction on the current building started in 1893, with the sanctuary completed in 1896.

References

External links
 First Presbyterian Church of Mankato

Churches on the National Register of Historic Places in Minnesota
Romanesque Revival church buildings in Minnesota
Churches completed in 1893
Churches in Blue Earth County, Minnesota
Richardsonian Romanesque architecture in Minnesota
Mankato, Minnesota
National Register of Historic Places in Blue Earth County, Minnesota